Meech Lake, a lake in Canada
 4367 Meech, a minor planet
 Meech (surname), surname